Git Along Little Dogies may refer to:

 "Git Along, Little Dogies", a traditional cowboy ballad
 Git Along Little Dogies (film), a 1937 film directed by Joseph Kane